Poru Telangana is a 2011 Telugu-language film directed by R. Narayana Murthy. The star cast includes R. Narayana Murthy. The other leading role of Telangana Martyr Srinivasa Chary was portrayed by debutant Rameez Ahmed.

Synopsis
Poru Telangana is a film on the 2009–11 Telangana movement.

Plot
A few students decide to participate in the movement for the creation of the separate state of Telangana, owing to a lack of employment opportunities.

Cast
R. Narayana Murthy. 
Rameez Ahmed as Telangana Martyr Srinivasa Chary

Production

Reception
A critic wrote that "R Narayana Murthy"s performance is at his usual best".

Soundtrack

References

2010s Telugu-language films
2011 films
Telangana movement